The Argentine military trials of 2009 were held to determine the validity of claims made against officers and NCOs by conscript and other soldiers for alleged brutality and misconduct during the 1982 Falklands War.

The first event involved accusations related to Argentine army officers and NCOs who were accused of handing out brutal field punishment to their troops after the Battle of Goose Green. "Our own officers were our greatest enemies", said Ernesto Alonso, the president of CECIM, a veterans' group founded by Rodolfo Carrizo and other conscripts of the 7th Regiment. "They supplied themselves with whiskey from the pubs, but they weren't prepared for war. They disappeared when things got serious". There are others who maintain that the conscripts were helped to make themselves as comfortable as possible under the circumstances and tried hard to bolster morale and that their officers and NCOs fought well and tried hard to bolster morale.

In 2009, Argentine authorities in Comodoro Rivadavia ratified a decision made by authorities in Río Grande, Tierra del Fuego, who, according to Argentina, have authority over the islands, by charging 70 officers and NCOs with inhumane treatment of conscript soldiers during the war. "We have testimony from 23 people about a soldier who was shot to death by a corporal, four other former combatants who starved to death, and at least 15 cases of conscripts who were staked out on the ground", Pablo Vassel, undersecretary of human rights in the province of Corrientes, told Inter Press Service News Agency.

On 19 May, a 12th Regiment conscript, Secundino Riquelme, reportedly died of heart failure after he had struggled for weeks to get accustomed to the cold weather, poor food and the bullying in his platoon that included fellow conscripts. Although his physical and mental collapse was evident, the other conscripts in his platoon failed to report it to the 12th Regimental medical officer, First Lieutenant Juan Adgigovich and the 12th Regiment chaplain, who would regularly visit their positions. There are claims, however, that false testimony was used as evidence in accusing the Argentine officers and NCOs of abandonment, and Vassel had reasign as undersecretary of human rights of Corrientes in 2010. Other veterans are sceptical about the accusations about Colonel Martiniano Duarte, an ex-601 Commando Company officer in the Falklands, and say that it has become "fashionable" for ex-conscripts to now accuse their superiors of abandonment.

A former conscript, Fernando Cangiano, of the 10th Armoured Cavalry Reconnaissance Squadron, which fought in the Falklands War, has also dismissed the claims about the "supposed widespread sadism present among the Argentine officers and NCOs" and the claim that the conscripts had not handled themselves well during the fight. A former conscript, César Trejo, of the 3rd Infantry Regiment, which also fought in the defence of the Argentine stronghold of Port Stanley, also accused ArgentineDefense Minister Nilda Garré of promoting a "state of confused politics" for the CECIM.

Sub-Lieutenant Gustavo Malacalza is accused of handing out field punishment in his platoon, in the form of having staked three conscripts at Goose Green, who has abandoned their positions to go looking for food and revealed their positions with gunfire. ""We said it was going to be us next"," said Private Mario Oscar Nuñez, who recalled the death of the conscript Riquelme. Soon after the British landings, he and two other conscripts took the decision to kill a sheep. The three men were skinning the sheep when they were discovered by Sub-Lieutenant Malacalza, who was accompanied by fellow conscripts of A Company, 12th Regiment and given a beating. "They started kicking and stamping on us. Finally came the staking".

Notes

References

Conflicts in 1982
Legal history of Argentina
Dirty War
Trials in Argentina
2009 in Argentina
Falklands War